The Ergun equation, derived by the Turkish chemical engineer Sabri Ergun in 1952, expresses the friction factor in a packed column as a function of the modified Reynolds number.

Equation

 and 

where:

 is the modified Reynolds number,
 is the packed bed friction factor
 is the pressure drop across the bed,
 is the length of the bed (not the column),
 is the equivalent spherical diameter of the packing,
 is the density of fluid,
 is the dynamic viscosity of the fluid,
 is the superficial velocity (i.e. the velocity that the fluid would have through the empty tube at the same volumetric flow rate)
 is the void fraction (porosity) of the bed.
 is the particle Reynolds Number (based on superficial velocity)
.

Extension
To calculate the pressure drop in a given reactor, the following equation may be deduced

This arrangement of the Ergun equation makes clear its close relationship to the simpler Kozeny-Carman equation which describes laminar flow of fluids across packed beds via the first term on the right hand side. On the continuum level, the second order velocity term demonstrates that the Ergun equation also includes the pressure drop due to inertia, as described by the Darcy–Forchheimer equation.

The extension of the Ergun equation to fluidized beds, where the solid particles flow with the fluid, is discussed by Akgiray and Saatçı (2001).

See also
Hagen–Poiseuille equation
Kozeny–Carman equation

References

  Ergun, Sabri. "Fluid flow through packed columns." Chem. Eng. Prog. 48 (1952).
  Ö. Akgiray and A. M. Saatçı, Water Science and Technology: Water Supply, Vol:1, Issue:2, pp. 65–72, 2001.

Equations
Chemical process engineering
Fluid dynamics